Sorbus domestica, with the common name service tree or sorb tree (because of its fruit), is a species of Sorbus native to western, central and southern Europe, northwest Africa (Atlas Mountains), and southwest Asia (east to the Caucasus).  It may be called true service tree, to distinguish it from wild service tree Sorbus torminalis.

It is a deciduous tree growing to 15–20 m (rarely to 30 m) tall with a trunk up to 1 m diameter, though it can also be a shrub 2–3 m tall on exposed sites. The bark is brown, smooth on young trees, becoming fissured and flaky on old trees. The winter buds are green, with a sticky resinous coating. The leaves are 15–25 cm long, pinnate with 13–21 leaflets 3–6 cm long and 1 cm broad, with a bluntly acute apex, and a serrated margin on the outer half or two thirds of the leaflet. The flowers are 13–18 mm diameter, with five white petals and 20 creamy-white stamens; they are produced in corymbs 10–14 cm diameter in late spring, and are hermaphrodite and insect pollinated. The fruit is a pome 2–3 cm long, greenish-brown, often tinged red on the side exposed to sunlight; it can be either apple-shaped (f. pomifera (Hayne) Rehder) or pear-shaped (f. pyrifera (Hayne) Rehder).

Ecology
It is generally rare, listed as an endangered species in Switzerland and Austria, and uncommon in Spain. In the UK, one very old tree that existed in the Wyre Forest before being destroyed by fire in 1862 used to be considered native, but it is now generally considered to be more likely of cultivated origin, probably from a mediaeval monastery orchard planting. More recently, a small population of genuinely wild specimens was found growing as stunted shrubs on cliffs in south Wales (Glamorgan) and nearby southwest England (Gloucestershire). It is a very rare species in Britain, occurring at only a handful of sites. Its largest English population is within the Horseshoe Bend Site of Special Scientific Interest at Shirehampton, near Bristol.

A further population has been discovered growing wild in Cornwall on a cliff in the upper Camel Estuary.

It is a long-lived tree, with ages of 300–400 years estimated for some in Britain.

The largest and perhaps one of the oldest known specimens in Europe is on an educational trail near the town of Strážnice in the province of Moravia, Czech Republic. It is estimated to be around 450 years old.

Cultivation and uses
 

The fruit is a component of a cider-like drink which is still made in parts of Europe. Picked straight off the tree, it is highly astringent and gritty; however, when left to blet (overripen) it sweetens and becomes pleasant to eat. In the Moravian Slovakia region of the Czech Republic, there is a community-run museum with an educational trail and a festival for this tree, with products like jam, juice and brandy made from its fruit.

The sorb tree is cited in the Babylonian Talmud, Tractate Ketubot, page 79a. The example refers to a purchase of Abba Zardasa, in a translation by Rashi, an early Medieval scholar, as a forest of trees called Zardasa, that was used for lumber, because the fruit was not commercially important. The Aramaic word 'zardasa' may be the origin of the English word 'sorb'.

In Ancient Greece the fruit was cut in half and pickled, which Plato in the Symposium (190d7-8) has Aristophanes use as a metaphor for the cutting in half of the original spherical humans by Zeus.

Service Tree wood was often used for manufacturing wooden planes of all types used for working wood, because Service Tree wood is fairly dense and holds a profile well.

Etymology and other names
The English name comes from Middle English serves, plural of serve, from Old English syrfe, borrowed from the Latin name sorbus; it is unrelated to the verb serve. Other English names include sorb, sorb tree, and whitty pear—"whitty" because the leaves are similar to rowan (i.e. pinnate), and "pear" due to the nature of the fruit. The name sorb, likewise, is from the Latin sorbus; it has nothing to do with the Slavic ethnic groups known as the Sorbs and Serbs.

References

Further reading 
 Wedig Kausch-Blecken von Schmeling: Der Speierling. Verlag Kausch, Bovenden 2000, 184 S.
 Hrdousek V. et al.: "The Service Tree - The Tree for a New Europe". Brazda, Hodonin, 2014, 240 pages; 550 pictures
 Sorbus domestica - distribution map, genetic conservation units and related resources. European Forest Genetic Resources Programme (EUFORGEN) 

domestica
Flora of Europe
Flora of North Africa
Flora of Turkey
Plants described in 1753
Taxa named by Carl Linnaeus
Sour fruits